Chasenella is a genus of harvestmen in the family Sclerosomatidae from Borneo.

Species
 Chasenella luma Roewer, 1933
 Chasenella pakka Roewer, 1933

References

Harvestmen